Bags & Trane is an album credited to jazz musicians Milt Jackson and John Coltrane, released in 1961 on Atlantic Records, catalogue SD 1368. Taking its title from Jackson and Coltrane's nicknames, it is the only collaborative record by the two, although only Jackson contributed original compositions. In actuality, the album belongs in Jackson's discography, as he was the session leader and still signed to Atlantic under the auspices of the Modern Jazz Quartet, and not in that of Coltrane, who had left the label for Impulse Records at the time of this album's first issue. However, like Prestige Records, as Coltrane's profile grew after he had stopped recording for the label, Atlantic released them with Coltrane's name more prominently displayed.

Reception
The contemporaneous DownBeat reviewer blamed the rhythm section for Jackson and Coltrane not gelling, and concluded: "the general impression is one of a session that could have been better, though it is still above the just-good mark".

Track listing

Side one

Side two

1988 Atlantic Records CD (with bonus tracks)
"Stairway to the Stars" (Matty Malneck, Mitchell Parish, Frank Signorelli) - 3:32
"The Late Late Blues" - 9:35
"Bags & Trane" - 7:25
"Three Little Words" - 7:29
"The Night We Called It a Day" - 4:22
"Be-Bop" - 8:00
"Blues Legacy" (Jackson) - 9:04
"Centerpiece" (Sweets Edison, Bill Tennyson) - 7:06

2010 and 2012 European releases on Essential Jazz Classics and Efor

Since 2009, when the recordings passed into the public domain in Europe, European record labels have issued editions of the album including additional tracks from the recording sessions and additional tracks not related to the original album recording sessions. The Essential Jazz Classics and Efor labels both released the album appended with two 1957 Prestige Records trio recordings of Coltrane playing blues compositions. While these releases conform with European laws, they are unlicensed and made without access to the original master tapes of the sessions.

"Bags & Trane"	- 7:26
"Three Little Words" - 7:30
"The Night We Called It a Day" - 4:22
"Be-Bop" - 8:00
"The Late Late Blues" - 9:35
"Stairway to the Stars" (Malneck, Parish, Signorelli) - 3:31
"Blues Legacy" - 9:04
"Centerpiece" (Edison, Tennyson) - 7:07
"Trane's Slow Blues" (bonus track) (John Coltrane) - 6:03	
"Slowtrane" (bonus track) (John Coltrane) - 7:19	

Different personnel on bonus tracks (9 & 10):

John Coltrane — tenor sax
Earl May — bass
Art Taylor — drums

Recorded at Hackensack, New Jersey, on 16 August 1957.

Personnel
 Milt Jackson — vibraphone
 John Coltrane — tenor saxophone
 Hank Jones — piano
 Paul Chambers — bass
 Connie Kay — drums

Production personnel
 Nesuhi Ertegün — producer
 Tom Dowd — engineer
 Lee Friedlander — photography
 Bob Porter — compact disc reissue producer

References 

1961 albums
Atlantic Records albums
John Coltrane albums
Milt Jackson albums
Albums produced by Nesuhi Ertegun
Hard bop albums
Collaborative albums